Unmistakable is the third studio album from Canadian country music artist Beverley Mahood. The album was released in Canada on November 18, 2008. The first single, "This Girl," was released to radio in May 2008.  The third track, "Freckles," is a cover version of a Natasha Bedingfield song of the same name released on her album Pocketful of Sunshine.

Track listing
"This Girl" - 3:16
"Rewrite History" - 4:21
"Freckles" - 3:51
"Unmistakable" - 3:55
"They Own This Town" - 3:36
"Could Have Had Me" - 3:26
"Good to Be Alive" - 4:00
"You Better Think Twice" - 3:22
"Come to Me" - 4:19
"Get There from Here" - 3:42
"You Get to Me" - 3:30
"Kick at the Can" - 3:13
"Anything Is Possible" - 4:18

2008 albums
Beverley Mahood albums